Shaheed-E-Kargil - A True Story is a Hindi war drama film of Bollywood directed by Dilip Gulati and produced by Farook. This movie was released on 26 January 2001 by Fairdeal Films based on Kargil War between India and Pakistan.

Plot
The movie is based on the Kargil armed conflict between Indian and Pakistan that took place between May and July 1999 in the Kargil district of Kashmir.

Cast
 Kiran Kumar
 Raza Murad
 Shehzad Khan
 Pramod Moutho
 Amrit Paul
 Rajeev Raj
 Vijay Solanki
 Amit Pachori

See more 
 LOC Kargil
 Border (1997 film)

References

External links
 

2001 films
2000s war drama films
2000s Hindi-language films
War films based on actual events
Indian war drama films
Films based on Indo-Pakistani wars and conflicts
Indian Army in films
Kashmir conflict in films
Military of Pakistan in films
2001 drama films